William de Beaufeu was a medieval Bishop of Thetford and a major landholder mentioned in the Domesday Book.

Life
William's land holdings were mainly in the county of Norfolk and Suffolk. He was a royal clerk before he was nominated to the see of Thetford on 25 December 1085 and consecrated in 1086. He died in 1091. He was probably related to Richard de Beaufou Bishop of Avranches from 1134 to 1142.

Notes

Citations

References
 British History Online Bishops of Norwich accessed on 29 October 2007
 Powicke, F. Maurice and E. B. Fryde Handbook of British Chronology 2nd. ed. London:Royal Historical Society 1961
 Spear, David S. "The Norman Empire and the Secular Clergy, 1066–1204" The Journal of British Studies Volume XXI Number 2 Spring 1982 p. 1-10

1000s births
1091 deaths
Anglo-Normans
Bishops of Thetford (ancient)
11th-century English Roman Catholic bishops